The 2022 Hull F.C. season was Hull F.C. 2022 season, in which they competed in Super League XXVII and the 2022 Challenge Cup. They were coached by Brett Hodgson.

Super League

League table

Challenge Cup

2022 squad

References

External links 

 

Hull F.C. seasons
Super League XXVII by club